X is the fifth studio album by the London-based grime music collective Roll Deep. It was released on 30 September 2012. The album was named X to represent the group's ten years within the music industry. Two singles have been released from the album, "Picture Perfect" and "Can't Wait for the Weekend".

Track listing

Release history

References

2012 albums
Roll Deep albums